The National Center for Civil and Human Rights is a museum dedicated to the achievements of  the civil rights movement in the United States and the broader worldwide human rights movement. Located in downtown Atlanta, Georgia, the museum opened to the public on June 23, 2014.

History
Evelyn Lowery, the wife of Joseph Lowery, Juanita Abernathy, the widow of Ralph David Abernathy, former Atlanta Mayor Andrew Young, and the late House Representative John Lewis initially conceived the concept of the center. They were part of the movement to grant civil rights to African-Americans during the 1960s. Lowery met with Mayor Shirley Franklin in 2001, who was warm to the concept of a museum honoring Atlanta's civil rights history, but due to more pressing issues with the city's finances, the mayor was unable to help much. The group met again in 2005, at which time the mayor signed onto the project, making the center to be established in 2007.

Five architectural firms presented their design proposals in 2009. The center ultimately selected a design by Architect Philip Freelon for a  museum that would break ground in 2010 and open in 2012. The  site for the museum, at Pemberton Place, was donated by the Coca-Cola Company and is located adjacent to three popular tourist attractions; the Georgia Aquarium, the World of Coca-Cola, and Centennial Olympic Park.

However, due to the Great Recession, fundraising was slower than expected. Support from Delta Air Lines and local philanthropists, including the Atlanta Falcons owner and The Home Depot co-founder Arthur Blank, each of whom contributed US$1 million was slow coming. But in October 2010, the center's chief executive officer, Doug Shipman, announced that the museum would be delayed a year, with groundbreaking scheduled for 2011 and opening in 2013.

In December 2011, the center announced another change in the plans for the museum, electing to build the facility in three phases, with the first  phase breaking ground in June 2012 and opening Memorial Day 2014. The change was partly motivated by the threat of losing $28.5 million from a tax allocation district fund if construction was not started by June 2012. Groundbreaking finally took place on June 27, 2012 in a ceremony attended by numerous dignitaries, including then-current Atlanta Mayor Kasim Reed and former mayors Franklin and Young.

On January 30, 2019, the center named Jill Savitt as CEO, effective March 11, 2019. She joined the center from the Simon-Skjodt Center for the Prevention of Genocide at the United States Holocaust Memorial Museum where she served as acting director. She replaced Brian Tolleson, who was serving as interim CEO.  He continued to serve on the center board.

Exhibits

The center hosts a number of exhibitions, both permanent and temporary, that not only tell the history of the civil rights movement in the United States, but also how that period is related to more contemporary human rights struggles around the world. During the development phase of the museum, it was determined that the average museum visitor would be more familiar with the events in Sudan or the Middle East than with events in Selma, Alabama, and that the civil rights history alone would not be enough to sustain the facility. The museum currently contains three permanent exhibitions, which the average visitor can view in about 75 minutes.  They are:

"Voice to the Voiceless: The Morehouse College Martin Luther King, Jr. Collection" contains personal effects that belonged to Dr. Martin Luther King Jr. The collection was obtained in 2006 when King's estate decided to sell a number of his letters and papers at auction. Before the auction took place, however, Mayor Franklin launched a bid to purchase them for $32 million, with Morehouse College owning the collection and the center having the rights to display it. The exhibit tells King's story from his youth through to his assassination and its aftermath and includes such papers as drafts of "Letter from Birmingham Jail" and "Drum Major Instinct", a sermon King delivered not long before his death.

"Rolls Down Like Water: The American Civil Rights Movement" is an interactive gallery that opens with examples of segregation in the United States as embodied in Jim Crow laws and signs designating facilities as "whites only". Designed by George C. Wolfe, the Tony Award-winning playwright, the gallery is broken up into multiple sections, each marked by a significant event in the civil rights movement, like Brown vs. Board of Education. A number of the exhibits are interactive, including a recreation of a lunch counter sit-in complete with headphones that simulate the taunts and threats leveled at activists.

"Spark of Conviction: The Global Human Rights Movement", unlike the other exhibits, is non-linear in design. The exhibit includes a rogues gallery of dictators, like Adolf Hitler and Augusto Pinochet, and counters them with images of modern-day activists who work to improve conditions of women and LGBT individuals around the world. One activity, called "Who Like Me", allows visitors to define themselves using a particular trait—such as their religion or gender—and shows them an individual who is persecuted in their homeland for that same trait.

Building design
The center's structure was created by design Architect Philip Freelon in partnership with HOK.

Reception
In early 2014, the New York Times named the Center for Civil and Human Rights as one of the biggest reasons to visit Atlanta in 2014, along with the soon-to-open Atlanta Streetcar and other new attractions. In a more thorough review of the center in June 2014, Edward Rothstein of the Times called the facility "imposing". Rothstein praised the design of the civil rights exhibit as "finely executed" and "the main source of the center's appeal". However, Rothstein took issue with the composition of the human rights exhibit, calling some of the components of the exhibit "arbitrary" and ultimately "leaving us with more questions than understanding".

See also
List of museums focused on African Americans

References

Further reading
Central Atlanta Progress (December 2006) Working Group Report City of Atlanta

External links

Official website

Civil rights organizations in the United States
Museums in Atlanta
African-American museums in Georgia (U.S. state)
Civil rights movement museums
Museums established in 2014
2014 establishments in Georgia (U.S. state)